Mark Peel may refer to:
 Mark Peel (historian)
 Mark Peel (chef)